DJP may refer to
DJP (album), by Daniel Padilla
DJP (DJ) (born 1973), American DJ and turntablist
Dalit Janajati Party
Directorate General of Taxes (Direktorat Jenderal Pajak) in Indonesia
Democratic Justice Party
Union of Printing, Journalism, and Paper (Gewerkschaft Druck, Journalismus, Papier) in Austria
Prim's algorithm, also known as the DJP algorithm